Founded in 1977, the International Society for Prevention of Child Abuse and Neglect (ISPCAN) is a multidisciplinary international organization that aims to prevent and treat child abuse, neglect and exploitation globally. It organizes the International Congress on Child Abuse and Neglect, the largest conference in the world about child abuse.

See also
 C. Henry Kempe
 The Kempe Center
 Children's Hospital (Aurora, Colorado)
 Childline South Africa

Footnotes

External links
ISPCAN

Child abuse-related organizations
Organizations established in 1977
International organizations based in the United States
Child sexual abuse